Shortridge–Meridian Street Apartments Historic District is a national historic district located at Indianapolis, Indiana.  The district encompasses 136 contributing buildings in a predominantly residential section of Indianapolis. It was developed between about 1900 and 1951, and includes representative examples of Colonial Revival, Classical Revival, Late Gothic Revival, Mission Revival, Renaissance Revival, Bungalow / American Craftsman, and Art Deco style architecture. Located in the district is the separately listed Shortridge High School.  Other notable buildings include the Vernon Court Apartments (1928), Fronenac Apartments (1951), Biltmore Apartments (1927), Meridian Apartments (1929), New Yorker Apartments (1917), Howland Manor (1929), Powell-Evans House (1911), Harms House (1906), Dorchester Apartments (1921), and Martin Manor Apartments (1916).

It was listed on the National Register of Historic Places in 2000.

References

Historic districts on the National Register of Historic Places in Indiana
Neoclassical architecture in Indiana
Gothic Revival architecture in Indiana
Colonial Revival architecture in Indiana
Mission Revival architecture in Indiana
Renaissance Revival architecture in Indiana
Art Deco architecture in Indiana
Historic districts in Indianapolis
National Register of Historic Places in Indianapolis